Betania is a settlement located on Tabuaeran atoll, Kiribati.
 
Tereitaki is to the north; with Paelau (the administrative centre of the atoll) to the south.

In the 2010 census 175 people were recorded as living in Betania.

References 

Populated places in Kiribati